Emma Jones (born 10 October 1994) is a footballer who plays as forward for Portsmouth and the Wales national team.

Early life
Jones was born in Ashford, Middlesex. After her family had moved to Dorset, she played youth football at Southampton FC Girls Centre of Excellence. She also played for Dorset and Hampshire. She moved to the John Madejeski Academy in 2011 as part of Reading's scholarship programme. Whilst with Reading she also played for Reading Ladies first and reserve teams.

Oregon State University
Jones played for American university team Oregon State Beavers from 2014 to 2017.

Club career
Jones signed for Swedish club Linköping in 2018 and played in the UEFA Women's Champions League. She then moved to Welsh club Cardiff City Ladies in January 2019 and scored nine goals.

Following her domestic success, Jones signed for English club Lewes FC in June 2019.

International career
Although born in England, Jones qualifies to play for Wales through her Cwmbran-born grandfather . She represented Wales at the youth levels, including at the 2013 UEFA Women's Under-19 Championship.

After her success in Sweden, Jones was called up to the senior team and made her international debut in January 2019.

International goals

References

External links

1994 births
Living people
Wales women's international footballers
Welsh women's footballers
Oregon State Beavers women's soccer players
Expatriate women's soccer players in the United States
Welsh expatriate sportspeople in the United States
Welsh expatriate sportspeople in Sweden
Linköpings FC players
Expatriate women's footballers in Sweden
Cardiff City Ladies F.C. players
Lewes F.C. Women players
Women's association football forwards